Saraswati Nagar is a Town in Yamunanagar District in the Indian state of Haryana.

Etymology
According to government records, the town was earlier known as Saraswati Tirth which was later under Muslim rule renamed as Mustafabad. It was officially renamed to Saraswati Nagar via a notification by the BJP government in 2016 after the Sarasvati River's paleochannel flowing through there.

Geography 
Saraswati Nagar is 18 km from Jagadhri and 23 km from Yamunanagar. This name arises from the presence of the Saraswati River. There is an old Shiva temple near this river.

Demographics
 India census, Saraswati Nagar had a population of 8513. Males constitute 53% of the population and females 47%. Saraswati Nagar has an average literacy rate of 72%, higher than the national average of 59.5%: male literacy is 77%, and female literacy is 68%. In Saraswati Nagar, 12% of the population is under 6 years of age.

References

Cities and towns in Yamunanagar district